Louis Tracy (1863–1928) was a British journalist, and prolific writer of fiction. He used the pseudonyms Gordon Holmes and Robert Fraser, which were at times shared with M. P. Shiel, a collaborator from the start of the twentieth century.

He was born in Liverpool to a well-to-do middle-class family. At first he was educated at home and then at the French Seminary at Douai. Around 1884 he became a reporter for a local paper, The Northern Echo at Darlington, circulating in parts of Durham and North Yorkshire; later he worked for papers in Cardiff and Allahabad. During 1892–1894 he was closely associated with Arthur Harmsworth, in The Sun and ''The Evening News and Post.

His fiction included mystery, adventure and romance.

External links
 
 
 
 Works by Louis Tracy at The Online Books Page

British short story writers
19th-century British novelists
20th-century British novelists
1863 births
1928 deaths
British male novelists
British male short story writers
19th-century British short story writers
19th-century British male writers
20th-century British short story writers
20th-century British male writers
British mystery writers